Polygonum heterophyllum Sol. ex Meisn. is a species of flowering plant in the family Polygonaceae, native to Uzbekistan, Turkmenistan and Tajikistan. It was first described by Daniel Solander in 1856.

(Polygonum heterophyllum Lindm. is a different species and is a synonym of Polygonum aviculare.)

References

heterophylum
Flora of Uzbekistan
Flora of Turkmenistan
Flora of Tajikistan
Plants described in 1856